Louis Saulnier may refer to:

 Louis Saulnier (writer), co-author of the cookbook Le Répertoire de la Cuisine
 Louis Saulnier (field hockey), French field hockey player